Francesco Duramano (18th century) was an Italian painter known for floral still lifes. He was born and active in Venice.

Duramano learned to paint from his mother, a painter of flowers. He became a prominent decorative painter.

References

18th-century births
18th-century Italian painters
Italian male painters
Painters from Venice
Italian still life painters
18th-century Italian male artists